Nationen is a Norwegian daily newspaper with a particular focus on agriculture and rural districts. Its circulation in 2015 was 12,954, an increase of 281 copies from 2014.

History and profile
Nationen was founded in 1918. The founding editor-in-chief was Thorvald Aadahl, and during his editorship the paper adopted a far-right political stance. The paper primarily targets farmers and the agrarian sector, with focus on district politics, farming, commentaries and features. It is based in Oslo with offices in Trondheim and Fagernes, and edited by Mads Yngve Storvik. The newspaper relies heavily on freelance journalists for regional coverage.

Traditionally Nationen was affiliated with the Centre Party. Its founding owner was the Farmers Association. The newspaper is fully owned by Tun Media, which is controlled by the Norwegian Agrarian Association, TINE, Nortura, Landkreditt, and others. Tun Media works to promote the interests of Norwegian agriculture and rural districts. The media group also owns other publications, such as Bondebladet. Nationen was against the EU membership of Norway.

Nationen has had a tabloid format since 1986. An online version, nationen.no, was formally launched in 2001.

The newspaper is dependent on economic support from the Norwegian Government.

Circulation
Numbers from the Norwegian Media Businesses' Association, Mediebedriftenes Landsforening.

 1980: 21455
 1981: 21780
 1982: 21563
 1983: 21648
 1984: 20566
 1985: 20691
 1986: 20021
 1987: 20370
 1988: 19726
 1989: 21388
 1990: 22367
 1991: 23011
 1992: 20805
 1993: 20102
 1994: 21278
 1995: 20278
 1996: 20235
 1997: 19104
 1998: 18311
 1999: 18307
 2000: 17376
 2001: 18652
 2002: 17554
 2003: 16987
 2004: 16484
 2005: 17061
 2006: 16996 
 2007: 15871
 2008: 15670
 2009: 14514
 ...
 2014: 12673
 2015: 12954

References

External links

1918 establishments in Norway
Daily newspapers published in Norway
Publications established in 1918
Norwegian-language newspapers
Centre Party (Norway) newspapers
Newspapers published in Oslo